Isaac Ratcliffe (born February 15, 1999) is a Canadian professional ice hockey left wing for the Milwaukee Admirals of the American Hockey League (AHL) as a prospect to the Nashville Predators of the National Hockey League (NHL). He was selected by the Philadelphia Flyers in the second round, 35th overall, of the 2017 NHL Entry Draft.

Early life
Ratcliffe was born on February 15, 1999, in London, Ontario, to Elaine and Al Ratcliffe. Born into a basketball family, Ratcliffe followed his older brother Landon into ice hockey, learning to skate at the age of three and playing in coordinated games two years later. He was childhood friends with fellow London native and future National Hockey League (NHL) player Nick Suzuki, and the pair would play ice hockey, golf, and soccer together. Originally a defenceman, Ratcliffe was converted to a power forward at the age of 11, as he spent most of his time in his team's offensive zone. He and Suzuki went on to play minor ice hockey together for the London Jr. Knights of Alliance Hockey. In his final season with the London Jr. Knights of the Alliance Hockey, Ratcliffe recorded 22 goals and 27 assists for a total of 49 points in 32 games.

Playing career

Junior
The Guelph Storm of the Ontario Hockey League (OHL) drafted Ratcliffe in the first round, 15th overall, of the 2015 OHL Priority Selection. He joined the team for the 2015–16 OHL season, scoring his first junior ice hockey goal on October 3, 2015, against goaltender Evan Cormier of the Saginaw Spirit. Ratcliffe finished his first season in Guelph with five goals and eight assists in 46 games. His rookie season was limited by a number of injuries, but he soon saw an offensive surge during the 2016–17 OHL season, with seven goals and 10 assists in the first 19 games of the season. With 43 games into his sophomore season, Ratcliffe had nearly tripled his previous-season totals, with 20 goals and 18 assists, and he was one of two Guelph Storm skaters named to the 2017 CHL/NHL Top Prospects Game. He finished the season with 56 points in 67 games, including a team-leading 28 goals, and was named the Storm's Most Improved Player. In June 2017, the Philadelphia Flyers selected Ratcliffe in the second round, 35th overall, of the 2017 NHL Entry Draft, and he signed an entry-level contract with them in August 2017.

After joining the Flyers for training camp, Ratcliffe returned to the Storm for the 2017–18 OHL season. He had trouble early in the season, struggling with his speed and accuracy, but soon picked up his play with 37 goals through his first 61 games. Finishing the season with 68 points and a career-high 41 goals, Ratcliffe earned the Glad Mowatt Most Valuable Player Award, Fay Scott Memorial Award, and Top Scorer Award at the Storm's end-of-year team banquet. When the Guelph season concluded, Ratcliffe joined the Lehigh Valley Phantoms, the Flyers' American Hockey League (AHL) affiliate, for the end of their 2017–18 season. He played two AHL games that season, scoring his first professional ice hockey goal on April 13, 2018, in a 5–2 win over the Bridgeport Sound Tigers.

Ratcliffe rejoined the Storm for the 2018–19 OHL season, where he was named captain. On March 18, 2019, Ratcliffe scored his 49th and 50th goals of the season in a 5–2 defeat of the Erie Otters, making him the fifth player in franchise history to reach the 50-goal mark in a single season. He finished the regular season with 50 goals and 82 points in 65 games, and he took home the Mickey Renaud Captain's Trophy for leadership in the OHL that spring. Ratcliffe added another 15 goals and 30 points in 24 OHL playoff games as he captained the Storm to their first J. Ross Robertson Cup in six years and a berth in the Memorial Cup. Although the Storm fell in the Memorial Cup semifinal round, Ratcliffe added an additional 15 goals and 14 assists in 24 games, and he was named to the Memorial Cup All-Star Team.

Professional

Philadelphia Flyers (2019–2023)
Ratcliffe joined the Phantoms again in 2019–20 for his first full season of professional ice hockey. He struggled with the transition from junior to professional level, particularly the greater resistance he faced from opposing skaters, but showed signs of improvement before the COVID-19 pandemic forced the cancellation of the 2019–20 AHL season. He finished the year with six goals and 15 points in 53 games with the Phantoms. He was also limited by injuries during the 2020–21 AHL season, with two goals and six assists in only 22 games.

Facing a slew of injuries to their forwards, the Flyers called Ratcliffe up to the NHL on January 27, 2022, to play on the fourth line with Zack MacEwen and Connor Bunnaman for their January 29 game against the Los Angeles Kings.

Nashville Predators (2023–present)
During the 2022–23 season, Ratcliffe was traded by the Flyers to the Nashville Predators in exchange for future considerations on February 26, 2023.

Career statistics

References

External links
 
 

1999 births
Living people
Canadian ice hockey forwards
Guelph Storm players
Ice hockey people from Ontario
Lehigh Valley Phantoms players
Milwaukee Admirals players
Philadelphia Flyers draft picks
Philadelphia Flyers players
Sportspeople from London, Ontario